is a Japanese cultural anthropologist who is a Professor in Residence at the Humanities Research Institute at the University of California, Irvine.  Her main professional interest is young people's use of media technology. She has explored the ways in which digital media are changing relationships, identities, and communities.

Early life
Mizuko Ito grew up between the United States and Japan. In Japan, she attended Nishimachi International School and the American School in Japan. She did her undergraduate work at Harvard University, graduating in 1990 with a degree in East Asian studies: her thesis was "Zen and Tea Ritual: A Comparative Analysis."

Ito did her graduate work at Stanford University. In 1991, she received a Masters of Arts degree in anthropology; her thesis was "The Holistic Alternative: A Symbolic Analysis of an Emergent Culture." In 1998, she received a Ph.D. from the Department of Education for her dissertation: "Interactive Media for Play: Kids, Computer Games and the Productions of Everyday Life." In 2003, she received a Ph.D. from the Department of Anthropology for her dissertation: "Engineering Play: Children’s Software and the Productions of Everyday Life."

Ito lives in Southern California with her husband, Scott Fisher, a virtual reality researcher, and their two children. She keeps a Bento Moblog, a visual record of the school lunches she prepares for her kids. Ito's brother is Joi Ito, former director of the MIT Media Lab. With her brother, she hosts Chanpon.org.

Career

Research interest
Ito's main professional interest are connected learning and young people's use of media technology. She has explored the ways in which digital media are changing relationships, identities, and communities. With Misa Matsuda and Daisuke Okabe, Ito edited Personal, Portable, Pedestrian: Mobile Phones in Japanese Life (MIT Press, 2005). She also investigated otaku fan culture with collaborators Daisuke Okabe and Izumi Tsuji, which resulted in the book Fandom Unbound: Otaku Culture in a Connected World.

Titles and grants
Ito is currently the Research Director of the Digital Media and Learning Hub, and a Professor in Residence at University of California, Irvine's Department of Anthropology, Department of Education, Department of Informatics, and School of Education. She is also the John D. and Catherine T. MacArthur Foundation Chair in Digital Media and Learning.

In 2006, Ito received a MacArthur Foundation grant to "observe children's interactions with digital media to get a sense of how they're really using the technology." This work led to creation of the Digital Media and Learning Research Hub (housed in the University of California Humanities Research Institute) and the publication of two books: Hanging Out, Messing Around, and Geeking Out and Engineering Play: A Cultural History of Children's Software.

Ito is CEO of Connected Camps, a benefit corporation that provides online learning programs in coding and the digital arts.

Bibliography
In January 2013, Ito and her collaborators, who include Kris Gutierrez, Sonia Livingstone, Bill Penuel, Jean Rhodes, Katie Salen, Juliet Schor, Julian Sefton-Green, and S. Craig Watkins, released Connected Learning: An Agenda for Research and Design, a synthesis report of the Connected Learning Research Network.

Mizuko Ito wrote or contributed to several books:
 Ito, Mizuko. "Virtually Embodied: The Reality of Fantasy in a Multi-User Dungeon" in Internet Culture, edited by David Porter. Routledge, 1997.
 Ito, Mizuko, Daisuke Okabe, Misa Matsuda, Eds. Personal Portable Pedestrian: Mobile Phones in Japanese Life. Cambridge: MIT Press, 2005.
 Ito, Mizuko. "Introduction." In Networked Publics, edited by Kazys Varnelis, 1-14. Cambridge, MA: The MIT Press, 2008.
 Ito, Mizuko, Heather A. Horst, Matteo Bittanti, danah boyd, Becky Herr Stephenson, Patricia G. Lange, C. J. Pascoe, and Laura Robinson. Living and Learning with New Media: Summary of Findings from the Digital Youth Project In The John D. and Catherine T. MacArthur Foundation Reports on Digital Media and Learning. Cambridge: MIT Press, 2008.
 Ito, Mizuko. Engineering Play: A Cultural History of Children's Software. Cambridge: MIT Press, 2009.
 Ito, Mizuko, Daisuke Okabe, Izumi Tsuji, Eds. Fandom Unbound: Otaku Culture in a Connected World. New Haven, CT: Yale University Press, 2012.
 Ito, Mizuko, Kris Gutiérrez, Sonia Livingstone, Bill Penuel, Jean Rhodes, Katie Salen, Juliet Schor, Julian Sefton-Green, S. Craig Watkins. 2013. Connected Learning: An Agenda for Research and  Design. Irvine, CA: Digital Media and Learning Research Hub.
 Ito, Mizuko, Sonja Baumer, Matteo Bittanti, danah boyd, Rachel Cody, Becky Herr, Heather A. Horst, Patricia G. Lange, Dilan Mahendran, Katynka Martinez et al. Hanging Out, Messing Around, Geeking Out: Kids Living and Learning with New Media. Cambridge: MIT Press, 2013.  .

See also
Digital anthropology
Connected learning

References

External links

Ito Faculty Profile, The Bren School of Information and Computer Sciences, University of California Irvine
Mizuko "Mimi" Ito's Personal/Professional Site

1968 births
American academics of Japanese descent
Harvard University alumni
Japanese anthropologists
Living people
Japanese mass media scholars
MUD scholars
Stanford University alumni
University of California, Irvine faculty
Japanese women anthropologists
People from Kyoto
Japanese emigrants to the United States
American School in Japan alumni